Memorial Ossuary Kumanovo is a memorial monument located in Kumanovo, North Macedonia. Itconsists of an obelisk and an ossuary containing the remains of communist guerrillas, killed during WWII in Kumanovo area.

Events

References

External links
kumanovskimuabeti.mk На Спомен Костурница беа одбележани 73 години од народното востание (видео и галерија) 11.10.2014
sitel.com.mk Article about celebration the Day of Revolution at the Ossuary in 2012

Buildings and structures in Kumanovo
World War II monuments and memorials in North Macedonia
Yugoslav World War II monuments and memorials